is a Prefectural Natural Park in southern Miyazaki Prefecture, Japan. Established in 1961, the park spans the municipalities of Mimata, Miyakonojō, Miyazaki, and Nichinan. The park encompasses a number of valleys in the Wanitsuka, and Tokuso mountains and is celebrated for its views of the Kirishima mountains and Sakurajima.

See also
 National Parks of Japan

References

External links
  Map of Wanitsuka Prefectural Natural Park

Parks and gardens in Miyazaki Prefecture
Protected areas established in 1961
1961 establishments in Japan